Daniel Newham, (stage name: , lit. "Big Bull") is a British performer working in China. He is famous for hosting the CCTV-4 programs Tongyue Wuzhou and Happy China.

History
Daniel Newham, who is of British and German descent, is originally from Cheltenham, England.

In September 1999 Newham arrived in China in order to study Chinese at Renmin University. After one year he studied film for one year at the Nanjing Art Institute.

In 2004 Newham graduated from Renmin University and became the host of the CCTV program Tongyue Wuzhou. He hosted the program Happy China until 2006.

Views on China
Newham recognizes that China has given him many opportunities and friends, and regards himself as a "Sinophiliac".

Popularity
Newham is regarded in China as being highly talented, and his performances have been acclaimed by audiences both within and outside of China.

Along with Mark Rowswell (stage name: Dashan), Newham is one of the few foreign celebrities in China who speak Standard Chinese fluently.

References

External links
 Official page of Happy China on CCTV's web site
Renmin University of China

Living people
English emigrants to China
English people of German descent
Renmin University of China alumni
British television personalities
Year of birth missing (living people)